In preparation for the next Romanian legislative election, which will take place no later than March 2025 (and most likely during late 2024), various polling companies and organisations from Romania have already (more specifically since December 2020 onwards) been carrying out a series of opinion polling to gauge voting intention among the overall electorate. The results of all these opinion polls are showcased in the yearly tables below in this Wikipedia article. The date range is between shortly after the previous legislative election, held on 6 December 2020, to early March 2023.

Polls

2023

2022

2021

Probable projection of seats in the next legislature

Approval ratings

2021 political crisis poll

Approval ratings for former Prime Minister Florin Cîțu (April–October 2021)

National approval rating

References and notes 

Opinion polling in Romania
Romania